Ronda Trese (English title: Thirteen Patrol) was a late evening news broadcast of IBC 13 in the Philippines. It aired from February 21, 2000, to January 4, 2002, replacing IBC Balita Ngayon and was replaced by IBC News Tonight.

Anchors
Elmer Mercado
Ida Marie Bernasconi

Substitute anchors
Karen Tayao-Cabrera (substitute anchor for Bernasconi)
Chele Mendoza (substitute anchor for Bernasconi)
Jun Veneracion (substitute anchor for Mercado)
Ron Gagalac (substitute anchor for Mercado)
Neil Santos III (substitute anchor for Mercado)

See also
List of programs previously broadcast by Intercontinental Broadcasting Corporation
IBC News and Public Affairs

Philippine television news shows
2000s Philippine television series
2000 Philippine television series debuts
2002 Philippine television series endings
Filipino-language television shows
Intercontinental Broadcasting Corporation original programming
IBC News and Public Affairs
Intercontinental Broadcasting Corporation news shows